Feng Yalan (born January 25, 1990) is a female Chinese table tennis player.

Career records
Singles (as of July 6, 2013)
ITTF World Tour winner (3): 2010 German Open. 2012 German Open, Russian Open.
World Junior Championships: winner (2006).

References

Chinese female table tennis players
Living people
1990 births
Place of birth missing (living people)
Table tennis players from Wuhan